Lynette "Lyn" Kay Gill  is an Australian female curler and curling coach.

Teams and events

Women's

Mixed

Mixed doubles

Record as a coach of national teams

Private life
Lynette is from curling family: her three daughters Tahli Gill, Kirby Gill and Jayna Gill are curlers and teammates (and mum Lyn is their longtime coach). They all (with Lynette as a curler on second position) won 2018 Australian Women's Curling Championship and played as Australian national women's team on 2018 Pacific-Asia Curling Championships.

References

External links
 

Living people
Australian female curlers
Australian curling coaches
Australian curling champions
Year of birth missing (living people)